Gérard Georges Victor Rousset (9 April 1921 – 3 February 2000) was a French fencer. He competed in the team épée event at the 1952 Summer Olympics.

References

External links
 

1921 births
2000 deaths
French male épée fencers
Olympic fencers of France
Fencers at the 1952 Summer Olympics
Sportspeople from Valence, Drôme